Monticello Field is a former airport and military airfield in Big Lake Township, Minnesota, United States, approximately a mile northeast of Monticello. It is inactive.

History
Opened during World War II as a  all-way turf airfield.  Provided contract glider training to the United States Army Air Forces, 1942–1944. Training provided by Hinck Flying Service.  Used primarily C-47 Skytrains and Waco CG-4 unpowered Gliders. The mission of the school was to train glider pilot students in proficiency in operation of gliders in various types of towed and soaring flight, both day and night, and in servicing of gliders in the field.

Inactivated during 1944 with the drawdown of AAFTC's pilot training program. Declared surplus and turned over to the Army Corps of Engineers on 30 September 1945. Eventually discharged to the War Assets Administration (WAA) and became a civil airport in 1946.

Operated as Pilots Cove Airfield (20Y).  Aerial photography shows the remains of a hangar and land indicates use as a turf runway, which are now closed.

See also

 Minnesota World War II Army Airfields
 29th Flying Training Wing (World War II)

References

 Manning, Thomas A. (2005), History of Air Education and Training Command, 1942–2002.  Office of History and Research, Headquarters, AETC, Randolph AFB, Texas 
 Shaw, Frederick J. (2004), Locating Air Force Base Sites, History’s Legacy, Air Force History and Museums Program, United States Air Force, Washington DC. 

USAAF Contract Flying School Airfields
USAAF Glider Training Airfields
Airfields of the United States Army Air Forces in Minnesota
Buildings and structures in Sherburne County, Minnesota